Royal Gendarmerie may refer to:

Hungarian Royal Gendarmerie
Royal Albanian Gendarmerie
Royal Moroccan Gendarmerie
Royal Gendarmerie of Cambodia
Royal Gendarmerie of Canada